Julie E Rickard (née Julie Charles) is a retired female badminton player from England.

Career
Rickard represented England and won a bronze medal in the women's doubles with Gillian Gilks, at the 1970 British Commonwealth Games in Edinburgh, Scotland.

She also reached the doubles final in the prestigious All England Open Badminton Championships, in 1970 and 1972.

As Julie Charles she won the 1958 & 1964 French Open, the 1958 Swiss Open and was English National champion in the doubles in 1966.

Personal life
She married in 1969 and afterwards competed as Julie Rickard.

References 

English female badminton players
Badminton players at the 1970 British Commonwealth Games
Commonwealth Games silver medallists for England
Living people
Commonwealth Games medallists in badminton
1939 births
Medallists at the 1970 British Commonwealth Games